Two Fists Against the Law is a 1980 martial arts movie, directed by Chan Chuen, produced by Ng See-yuen and starring Alan Chui Chung-San and Hwang Jang-lee. The film is also known as Twin Bitter.

Plot

Lee Yong and Fang Erh, known as extremely cunning men in the town decide to rob Master Tai (Hwang Jang Lee) with his new consignment, since it has been rumored to be worth seven million. Meanwhile, local police captain (Melvin Wong) tries to change their ways. Eventually they discover that Master Tai has been trading 
opium. Lee Yong and Fang Erh help the local policeman to fight against the Master Tai for justice.

Cast
Alan Chui Chung-San - Fang Erh
Hwang Jang-lee - Master Tai
Melvin Wong - Local Police Captain
Chik Ngai Hung - Lee Yong
Chiang Kam - Scammed by Fang Erh
Chung Fat - Debt Collector who gets beaten by Lee Yong
To Siu Ming - Police Captain's sidekick
Pau Yung Sheng - Police Captain's sidekick
Lee Fat Yuen - Thug 
Mang Hoi - Thug 
Chan Kwok Kuen - Thug
Philip Ko 
Chan Dik Hak - Master Tai's son
Chan Chuen 
Cheng Chok Chow
Chan Siu-Kai
Lo Wei

Reception
The film has mixed reviews. Rarekungfumovies.com give it 3 stars out of 5.

Home media
The movie was released on VHS with an English dubbed version and a VCD version with Cantonese and Mandarin duo audio version. In 1990, they released a VCD version with original Cantonese dubbed version as well.

References

http://www.rarekungfumovies.com/titles/title1252.html

1980 martial arts films
1980 films
Kung fu films
Hong Kong martial arts films
1980s Cantonese-language films
1980s Mandarin-language films
1980s Hong Kong films